Get Britain Out is a United Kingdom based independent cross-party grassroots Eurosceptic Group which campaigned for the United Kingdom to leave the European Union. The campaign is still in operation and is pushing for the UK to break away from continued alignment with the European Union.

Background
The EU Referendum Campaign Limited was registered in July 2012. Get Britain Out is a trading name of The EU Referendum Campaign Limited and was founded in 2010. Jayne Adye has been the director of Get Britain Out since its inception, and has been involved in the campaign since 2012. 

The campaign's original aim was to push for an in/out referendum on Europe on the UK's membership of the EU.

2016 EU referendum
Following the announcement of an EU referendum to be held on 23 June 2016, Get Britain Out campaigned vigorously for the Leave side, advocating the UK step away from the EU to pursue a global future outside the European Single Market and the Customs Union, enabling the UK to develop free trade deals with the rest of the world as well as regain controls over immigration, our security and our sovereignty. 

During the referendum campaign, Get Britain Out regularly co-operated with other pro-Leave organisations to help build a coalition of Leave voices which could reach beyond the normal political bubble.

After the referendum
In the immediate aftermath of the referendum, Get Britain Out called for Article 50 to be triggered immediately. However, Remain-supporting Prime Minister David Cameron resigned on the morning after the vote, the Conservative Party was thrown into a Leadership debate and eventually another Remainer, Theresa May, was appointed as Prime Minister in July. However, the fight for the Brexit vote to be implemented was far harder than many had anticipated. 

Get Britain Out has continued since the referendum, insisting the UK makes a significant break from the EU. It regularly launches campaigns encouraging its supporters to contact the Prime Minister, the Cabinet and MPs from all parties to encourage the Government to push for a ‘real Brexit’ for the benefit of the UK, prioritising the country's interests over those of the EU.  

Get Britain Out was vehemently opposed to Theresa May’s Withdrawal Agreement and constantly lobbied MPs to vote against it on all occasions, arguing it failed to deliver anything close to a Real Brexit. With no Withdrawal Agreement in place, Get Britain Out called for the UK to leave the EU on ‘no deal’ World Trade Organization terms, arguing any extension to the transition period would be going against the result of the referendum. When Theresa May was removed from her position, something for which Get Britain Out had advocated, the campaign backed Boris Johnson over Jeremy Hunt in the ensuing Conservative Party Leadership Election.

Boris Johnson’s new deal
After Prime Minister Boris Johnson came back with a new withdrawal agreement, Get Britain Out agreed it was a vast improvement on Theresa May’s, but argued there were still major flaws that would need to be improved in future negotiations with the EU during the course of any transition period.

2019 general election
As a cross-party campaign, Get Britain Out did not support any specific political party at the election. Instead, it recommended its supporters vote for any leave-supporting candidate who stood the best chance of winning. 

Particular focus was placed on displacing remain-supporting MPs who represented leave-supporting seats, and former Conservatives such as Dominic Grieve, Anna Soubry and Dr Philip Lee. Get Britain Out had consistently argued these MPs should not have been able to change parties or go directly against manifesto commitments without facing a by-election. 

Following the Conservatives' general election victory with a majority of 80, Get Britain Out praised Boris Johnson for his strong words on Brexit during the campaign. The group also paid homage to Nigel Farage and the Brexit Party for the role they played in the election by taking the decision to stand down candidates in crucial seats around the country.

Future negotiations 
Get Britain Out has pushed for a hard-line approach to future negotiations with the EU, arguing the UK must not accept continued political alignment with the EU. This includes, if necessary, triggering Article 16 of the Northern Ireland Protocol in order to protect the UK's national sovereignty.

See also
The Brexit Party
Vote Leave
Better Off Out
Business for Britain
 Believe in Britain

References

Euroscepticism in the United Kingdom
Brexit–related advocacy groups in the United Kingdom
Organisations associated with the Conservative Party (UK)